Catching Fire is a 2009 novel by Suzanne Collins.

Catching Fire may also refer to:
 The Hunger Games: Catching Fire, a 2013 film sequel to The Hunger Games and adaptation of the novel
 Catching Fire: How Cooking Made Us Human, a 2009 book by Richard Wrangham
 Catching Fire, a 1982 novel by Kay Nolte Smith

See also
 Combustion
 Catch a Fire (disambiguation)